John Hatfield (2 March 1831 – 5 July 1889) was an English cricketer.  Hatfield's batting style is unknown.  He was born at Southwell, Nottinghamshire.

Hatfield made a single first-class appearance for Nottinghamshire against Surrey in 1854 at Broadwater Park, Godalming.  Surrey won the toss and elected to bat first, making 113 all out in their first-innings.  Nottinghamshire responded in their first-innings by making 100 all out, with Hatfield, who opened the batting, scoring 3 runs before he was dismissed by Heathfield Stephenson.  Surrey then made 107 all out in their second-innings, leaving Nottinghamshire with a target of 121 for victory.  However, Nottinghamshire could only manage to make just 55 all out in their second-innings, during which Hatfield, who had moved down the order to number seven, scored a single run before he was dismissed by Tom Shermam.  This was his only major appearance for Nottinghamshire.

He died at Rugby, Warwickshire, on 5 July 1889.

References

External links
John Hatfield at ESPNcricinfo
John Hatfield at CricketArchive

1831 births
1889 deaths
People from Southwell, Nottinghamshire
Cricketers from Nottinghamshire
English cricketers
Nottinghamshire cricketers